John M. Patterson School is a historic elementary school located in the Penrose neighborhood of Philadelphia, Pennsylvania. It is part of the School District of Philadelphia The building was designed by Irwin T. Catharine and built in 1920–1921. It is a three-story, eight bay by three bay, brick building on a raised stone basement in the Colonial Revival-style. It features a large center entrance, stone coping, and a parapet.

The building was added to the National Register of Historic Places in 1988.

References

External links

School buildings on the National Register of Historic Places in Philadelphia
Colonial Revival architecture in Pennsylvania
School buildings completed in 1921
School District of Philadelphia
Southwest Philadelphia
Public elementary schools in Philadelphia
1921 establishments in Pennsylvania